Ottumwa may refer to: 

 Ottumwa, Iowa
 Ottumwa, Kansas
 Ottumwa, South Dakota
 Ottumwa (YTB-761), a United States Navy large harbor tug named for Ottumwa, Iowa
 Ottumwa (crater), an impact crater on Mars named after Ottumwa, Iowa